('God with us') is a phrase commonly used in heraldry in Prussia (from 1701) and later by the German military during the periods spanning the German Empire (1871–1918), Nazi Germany (1933–1945), and the early years of West Germany (1949–1962). It was also commonly used by Sweden in most of its wars and especially as a battle cry during the Thirty Years' War.

Origins 
Matthew 1:23 refers to the prophecy written in Isaiah 7:14, glossing the name Immanuel (Emmanuel) as 'God with us':

Usage

Roman Empire 
 in Latin,  in Ancient Greek, was a battle cry of the later Roman Empire and of the Byzantine Empire.

Germany 
It was used for the first time in Germany by the Teutonic Order.

In the 17th century, the phrase  was used as a 'field word', a means of recognition akin to a password, by the army of Gustavus Adolphus at the battles of Breitenfeld (1631), Lützen (1632) and Wittstock (1636) in the Thirty Years' War.

In 1701, Frederick I of Prussia changed his coat of arms as Prince-Elector of Brandenburg. The electoral scepter had its own shield under the electoral cap. Below, the motto  appeared on the pedestal.
The Prussian Order of the Crown was Prussia's lowest ranking order of chivalry, and was instituted in 1861. The obverse gilt central disc bore the crown of Prussia, surrounded by a blue enamel ring bearing the motto of the German Empire .

At the time of the completion of German unification in 1871, the imperial standard bore the motto  on the arms of an Iron Cross. Imperial German 3 and 5 mark silver and 20 mark gold coins had  inscribed on their edge.

German soldiers had  inscribed on their belt buckles in the First World War. The slogan entered the mindset on both sides; in 1916 a cartoon was printed in the New-York Tribune captioned "Gott Mit Uns!", showing "a German officer in spiked helmet holding a smoking revolver as he stood over the bleeding form of a nurse. It symbolized the rising popular demand that the United States shed its neutrality".

In June 1920, George Grosz produced a lithographic collection in three editions entitled . A satire on German society and the counter-revolution, the collection was swiftly banned.

Gallery

See also

In God We Trust
Dieu et mon droit
God zij met ons
Gravi de pugna

References

External links 
 "Gott mit Uns". Time. September 18, 1944.

Battle cries
German words and phrases
House of Hohenzollern
National mottos
Quotations from religion
Frederick I of Prussia